Hojat Shakiba (born 1949 in Gorgan) is an Iranian painter.

A graduate of the Faculty of Fine Arts of the University of Tehran, he is known for his paintings on Persian television series, and collaborated with the director Ali Hatami. His painting books include “Khayyam”, “Hafez”, “Irandokht”, and “Role of Photos in Iranian Art”.

External links
 Paintings on Achaemenids on display at Tehran gallery - Tehran Times

1949 births
Iranian painters
Living people
People from Gorgan